Hopedale Industrial Park Airport , in Hopedale, Massachusetts, is a private airport open to the public. It is owned by the Hopedale Industrial Park.  It has one runway and sees very low traffic. Approximately sixteen aircraft are based at Hopedale. At one point, it housed a flight school and offered plane rentals.

References

External links

Airports in Worcester County, Massachusetts